Synersaga brevidigitata is a moth in the family Lecithoceridae. It is found in China (Yunnan).

References

Moths described in 2014
brevidigitata
Moths of Asia